The 2016 TCR Trophy Europe was the first season of the TCR Trophy Europe.

Calendar and results
The 2016 schedule was announced on 26 February 2016. The calendar includes rounds from the Russian, Italian, Benelux, German and Portuguese TCR series.

Championship standings
Only the best four results count towards the championship. The race classification is given by the aggregate points classification of the round.

References

External links

Europe
2016 in European sport